Aphelia is a genus of tortrix moths in tribe Archipini.

Species

Aphelia aglossana (Kennel, 1899)
Aphelia albidula Bai, 1992
Aphelia albociliana (Herrich-Schaffer, 1851)
Aphelia alleniana (Fernald, 1882)
Aphelia caradjana (Caradja, 1916)
Aphelia caucasica Kostyuk, 1975
Aphelia christophi Obraztsov, 1955
Aphelia cinerarialis Bai, 1992
Aphelia conscia Razowski, 1981
Aphelia corroborata (Meyrick, 1918)
Aphelia deserticolor Diakonoff, 1983
Aphelia disjuncta (Filipjev, 1924)
Aphelia effigies (Obraztsov, 1968)
Aphelia euxina (Djakonov, 1929)
Aphelia finita (Meyrick, 1924)
Aphelia flexiloqua Razowski, 1984
Aphelia fuscialis Bai, 1992
Aphelia galilaeica Obraztsov, 1968
Aphelia gregalis Razowski, 1981
Aphelia icteratana (Staudinger, 1880)
Aphelia ignoratana (Staudinger, 1880)
Aphelia imperfectana (Lederer, 1859)
Aphelia insincera (Meyrick, 1912)
Aphelia inumbratana (Christoph, 1881)
Aphelia koebelei Obraztsov, 1959
Aphelia mongoliana Razowski, 1981
Aphelia ochreana (Hubner, [1796-1799])
Aphelia paleana (Hubner, 1793)
Aphelia peramplana (Hubner, [1825] 1816)
Aphelia plagiferana (Rebel, 1916)
Aphelia polyglochina Razowski, 1981
Aphelia septentrionalis Obraztsov, 1959
Aphelia stigmatana (Eversmann, 1844)
Aphelia tshetverikovi Danilevsky, 1963
Aphelia unitana (Hubner, [1796-1799])
Aphelia viburnana ([Denis & Schiffermuller], 1775)

Synonyms
Amelia Hübner, [1825] 1816
Anaphelia Razowski, 1981 [subgenus of Aphelia]
Djakonovia Obraztsov, 1942 [subgenus of Aphelia]
Sacaphelia Razowski, 1981 [subgenus of Aphelia]
Tortricomorpha Amsel, 1955 [preoccupied]
Zelotherses Lederer, 1859 [subgenus of Aphelia]

See also
 List of Tortricidae genera

References

 , 2005: World catalogue of insects volume 5 Tortricidae.
 , 1816, Verz. bekannter Schmett.: 390.
 , 1959: Note on North American Aphelia species (Lepidoptera, Tortricidae). American Museum Novitates  1964: 1-9. Full article: .

External links

 tortricidae.com

 
Archipini
Tortricidae genera
Taxa named by Jacob Hübner